The Two Who Stole the Moon is a 1962 Polish children's film based on Kornel Makuszyński's 1928 story of the same name.

Despite having been known to Polish children for many generations, the film gained renewed fame in the 2000s for starring two of the country's future leaders: Lech Kaczyński, who served as President of Poland from 2005 until his death in a 2010 plane crash, and his identical twin brother Jarosław Kaczyński, the Prime Minister of Poland from 2006 to 2007, Chief of Office of the President of Poland from 1990 to 1991, and current chairman of the Law and Justice party. The twins were thirteen at the time.

Plot
The two twins, Jacek and Placek, start out as cruel and lazy boys whose main interest is eating, eating anything, including chalk and a sponge in school. One day they have the idea of stealing the Moon; after all, it is made of gold.
  "If we steal the moon, we would not have to work" 
  "But we do not work now, either..."
  "But then we would not have to work at all".

After a few small adventures, they manage to steal the Moon. Immediately a gang of robbers notices the little thieves and captures them. The two regain their freedom, and one of the twins devises a plan to enter the "City of Gold". The plan works, but when the robbers try to collect the gold, they turn into gold themselves. The twins escape and then run home and promise to help their parents with their work as farmers.

An animated version of the film was also produced in 1984, with virtually the same plot.

The musical track from the 1984 animated film includes music by the popular Polish rock group Lady Pank. The film has been compared to the Beatles' involvement in Yellow Submarine, as they were both designed to boost said groups' popularity.

Cast
 Lech Kaczyński - Jacek
 Jarosław Kaczyński - Placek
 Ludwik Benoit - Wojciech, father of Jacek and Placek
 Helena Grossówna - mother of Jacek and Placek
 Janusz Strachocki - mayor of Zapiecek
 Tadeusz Woźniak - teacher in Zapiecek
 Janusz Kłosiński - Mortadella
 Wacław Kowalski
 Henryk Modrzewski - Tailor of Zapiecek
 Bronisław Darski - Barnaba
 Stanisław Tylczyński
 Janusz Ziejewski
 Włodzimierz Skoczylas
 Tadeusz Schmidt
 Ryszard Ronczewski - Robber "Rozporek"

References

External links

FilmWeb
Stopklatka

1962 films
Polish children's films
Films based on children's books
Films about twin brothers
Moon in film
1960s Polish-language films
Films based on fairy tales
1960s children's films